"Dowisetrepla" is the seventh episode in the third season of the television series How I Met Your Mother and 51st overall. It originally aired on November 5, 2007.

Plot
Marshall and Lily finally become tired of Ted's never-ending presence and his invasion on the married couple's personal space, so they decide to rent a new apartment. In the newspaper they find an apartment in a neighborhood called 'Dowisetrepla,’ which is explained as part of New York City's tendency to shorten neighborhood names (such as Tribeca and Soho), and is supposedly an up-and-coming neighborhood in the city. The apartment is for sale, rather than for rent, but Marshall convinces Lily to view it with him.

Marshall falls in love with the apartment in Dowisetrepla, imagining himself playing drums in a band with his future sons. Lily feels guilty because of the huge credit card debt she hides from Marshall, but still imagines herself painting with two daughters and eventually ends up saying that she loves the apartment, despite Robin persisting that Lily tell Marshall the truth.

Meanwhile, Barney hooks up with a young woman, Meg, and takes her to the apartment in Dowisetrepla so he can sneak out while she is in the shower.

The next day, Lily and Marshall apply for a mortgage, resulting in Marshall finding out about Lily's credit card debt. Later, Ted, Barney, and Robin go home, where Ted discovers that Lily and Marshall were having a fight based on "evidence" strewn about the room. Ted incorrectly concludes the fight was over something minor (the peanut butter jar, Lily leaving the jar out after Marshall's repeated insistence to not do so) while believing that Robin's truth about the credit card debt as bogus. To prove his theory, Ted hits re-dial on the apartment phone, expecting the number to be Marshall's cell phone, which Lily would have called to apologize and make up. They instead hear the receptionist of a divorce lawyer and panic. Robin reveals the truth to Barney and Ted about Lily's debt, and they all begin to consider how their lives will be with Lily and Marshall broken up. Robin insists that Lily will “get” her in the breakup, remaining friends but not being in contact with the other members of the group, while Marshall will “get” Ted and Barney. Lily and Marshall return and explain that Lily had the idea of divorcing Marshall so he would not be dragged down by her debt. However, Marshall replied by saying, "When I married you, I married all your problems, too." Finally, they exclaim that they bought the apartment.

The next day, Lily and Marshall take a taxi to their new home, but as they step out of the cab, they smell an extremely strong stench. The cab driver reveals that the area is near the sewage treatment plant, but the plant is shut down on weekends. They realize that "DoWiSeTrePla" is short for: DOwnWInd of the SEwage TREatment PLAnt and this reveals why the real estate agent wanted the apartment to be viewed on the weekends.

Critical response

Donna Bowman of The A.V. Club rated the episode A−. She compares the show to Friends and notes the appearance of actress Maggie Wheeler, who previously played Chandler's on-and-off girlfriend Janice, as the real estate agent.

Staci Krause of IGN gave the episode 8.0 out of 10.

References

External links

How I Met Your Mother (season 3) episodes
2007 American television episodes